Roger Milliot (1927, Le Creusot – 1968) was a French poet and painter. He served as a soldier in Indochina and as such had a pension. His health problems prevented him from becoming an ornamentalist. Like his idol René Char, he preferred provincial life to that of Paris and lived in Montauban, where there is now a museum of his paintings, mostly portraits of women. His depression and feelings of frustration led him to suicide by drowning in the Seine river. His poems were published posthumously.

Works 

 QUI?, 1968
 QUI?, 1969 – definitive edition, illustrated and with a portrait

References 
 Poètes maudits d'aujourd'hui: 1946-1970, Roger Milliot by Félix Castan, p. 124
 Ivan Slavík, Rozklenout srázné, Olomouc, 1993, p. 86

1927 births
1968 suicides
Poètes maudits
20th-century French poets
French male poets
20th-century male writers
Suicides by drowning in France
20th-century French male writers
1968 deaths